Irvin Studin (born 1976) is a Canadian academic, publisher, writer, and think tank president. He is the founder, editor-in-chief, and publisher of Global Brief magazine, and president of The Institute for 21st Century Questions, a leading Canadian think tank. He is also the chair of the Worldwide Commission to Educate All Kids (Post-Pandemic), an international initiative to address the catastrophe of hundreds of millions of children ousted from all forms of schooling during the COVID-19 pandemic.

A former athlete, he played soccer in the USL A-League and the Canadian Professional Soccer League, and was a two-time All-Canadian and captain of the York University Varsity Soccer Team. He earned two Blues with Oxford University's varsity soccer team.

Education, academic, and policy career 
Having attended York University for undergraduate studies as a President's Scholar, he graduated with a Bachelor of Business Administration degree from the Schulich School of Business in 1999, winning the Murray G. Ross Award, the university's highest honour given to a graduating undergraduate. Studin studied abroad at the University of Oxford under a Rhodes Scholarship in 1999, completing a Master of Arts degree in philosophy, politics and economics two years later. He continued his education at the London School of Economics in 2001 and 2002, studying international relations. Returning to York University in 2007, Studin completed a Doctor of Philosophy degree in constitutional law in 2011 at Osgoode Hall Law School, winning the Governor General's gold medal.

Studin was the first recruit of the Government of Canada's Recruitment of Policy Leaders Program in 2001–02, and was a member of the small team that wrote Canada's first-ever national security policy in 2004. He was the principal author of Australia's 2006 national counter-terrorism policy in the John Howard period. Following a career in the Privy Council Office in Ottawa and the Department of the Prime Minister and Cabinet in Canberra, Studin began a career as an educator, editor and writer. He founded Global Brief magazine in 2009, and co-founded The Institute for 21st Century Questions in 2014.

Previously a professor and program director at the School of Public Policy and Governance, University of Toronto from 2009 until 2014, Studin was a visiting professor at leading schools of public policy in North America, Europe and Asia, including the Lee Kwan Yew School of Public Policy in Singapore, Ukraine's Higher School of Public Administration and Russia's Academy of National Economy and Public Administration. Studin has also served as an associated member of the faculty of Chaire Raoul-Dandurand en études stratégiques et diplomatiques at Université du Québec à Montréal. He was an appointed member of the first-ever advisory board for the Canadian Foreign Service Institute, Canada's diplomatic academy.

Studin has written, in various languages, for papers and publications ranging from the Financial Times to Le Monde, the Globe & Mail, Toronto Star, Toronto Sun, National Post, Ottawa Citizen, La Presse, Le Devoir, Policy Options, the Montreal Gazette, the Indian Express, Vedomosti, the South China Morning Post, The Australian, the Daily FT (Sri Lanka) and The Straits Times (Singapore).

In February 2020, he announced his intentions of running in the 2020 Conservative Party of Canada leadership election.

In June 2022, Studin participated as a speaker in a retrospective seminar titled A Citizens' Hearing in Toronto, Ontario, evaluating the public health and government response to the COVID-19 pandemic in Canada. He spoke on the subject of impacts to education.

Playing career 
Studin played college soccer with the York Lions, where he served as team captain. He was a two-time All-Canadian, three-time All-Ontario all-star, and four-time Academic All-Canadian. A left-footed playmaker and scorer with high speed, skill and vision, his youth soccer career was spent with Armourdale Soccer Club (as a member of one of Canada's strongest-ever youth teams), Woodbridge Soccer Club, North York Hearts, East York and, finally, Spartacus Soccer Club. In 1996, Studin was the MVP of the Under-21 Ontario Soccer League.

In 1997, he played with the Toronto Lynx in the USL A-League, alongside teammates like Dwayne De Rosario, Paul Stalteri and Pat Onstad. He made his debut on May 23, 1997, in a match against Charleston Battery. In 1998, he signed with Glen Shields S.C. in the newly formed Canadian Professional Soccer League. The following season, he signed with rivals York Region Shooters. He also trained professionally with Oxford United Football Club in the United Kingdom, and Hapoel Ashkelon Football Club in Israel. Studin was inducted into the York University Sports Hall of Fame in 2012.

He represented Canada at the 1997 Maccabiah Games and the 1999 Pan-American Maccabi Games.

Personal life 
Studin was born in Rome, Italy to a Russian Jewish family from Odessa, Soviet Union. The family immigrated to Hamilton, Ontario in 1976, when Studin was two months old. He played soccer, hockey, tennis and the trumpet in his youth. He grew up in North York and Thornhill, Ontario, and attended Aurora High School, graduating as valedictorian. Studin speaks English, French, Russian and German.

His father Yuri Studin founded the Spartacus Soccer Club, alumni of which include present and former Canadian national soccer team players like Derek Cornelius (a member of Canada's 2002 World Cup team in Qatar), Joseph Dichiara and Daniel Haber. Irvin Studin continues to volunteer-coach teams and players at Spartacus Soccer Club when time permits. His mother Sima is a former Soviet Master of Sport in rhythmic gymnastics.

Bibliography

Nonfiction
 2006 – What Is a Canadian?: Forty-Three Thought-Provoking Responses
 2014 – The Strategic Constitution: Understanding Canadian Power in the World
 2018 – Russia: Strategy, Policy and Administration
 2022 – Canada Must Think for Itself: 10 theses for our country's survival & success in the 21st century

References 

1976 births
Living people
Canadian soccer players
Toronto Lynx players
York Region Shooters players
A-League (1995–2004) players
Canadian Soccer League (1998–present) players
Association football midfielders
Sportspeople from Ontario
Canadian Jews
Canadian people of Russian-Jewish descent